Eupithecia marasa is a moth in the family Geometridae. It is found in Turkey.

References

Moths described in 1934
marasa
Moths of Asia